Semantic structure analysis (or SSA) is a methodology for systematic description of the intended meaning of natural language, developed by the Summer Institute of Linguistics. The name is also used for Eugene Nida's technique for mapping lexical items from a source language to a receptor language in translation theory.

See also 
 Semantic analysis

Notes and references

Bibliography 
 Beekman, John, John C. Callow, and Michael F. Kopesec (1981). The Semantic Structure of Written Communication. Dallas: Summer Institute of Linguistics.
 Bouchard, Denis. The Semantics of Syntax: a minimalist approach to grammar.
 Bruce, Leslie P. (1998). "The semantics of reconciliation in three languages". Notes on Linguistics 83: 9–34.
 Casad, Eugene H., ed., (1996). Cognitive Linguistics in the Redwoods: the expansion of a new paradigm in linguistics. Cognitive Linguistics Research 6. Berlin: Mouton de Gruyter.
 Erikson, Richard J. (1999). "The damned and the justified in Romans 5:12–21". In Jeffrey T. Reed, Stanley E. Porter (eds). Discourse Analysis and the New Testament: approaches and results. Continuum International Publishing Group.
 Ohori, Toshio (1996). "Case Markers and Clause Linkage: toward a semantic typology". In Casad (1996): 693–712.
 Palmer, R. F. (ed.). Grammar and Meaning: essays in honor of Sir John Lyons.
 Tuggy, David (1996). "The thing  that people talk that way. The question  Why?" In Casad (1996): 713–752.
 Wierzbicka, Anna. Understanding cultures through their key words: English, Russian, Polish, German, and Japanese.

External links 
 Semantic Structure Analysis — a bibliography of SIL-authored, theoretical-SSA publications at their official website, Ethnologue.com
 Semantic Structure Analysis — a bibliography of SIL-authored, applied-SSA publications, also at Ethnologue.com

Discourse analysis